Jonathan Sundy Zongo (born 6 April 1989) is a Burkinabé retired footballer who played as a winger or forward.

He spent the better part of his 11-year senior career in Spain, appearing in 111 competitive matches for Almería and taking part in two La Liga seasons with the club. He also played professionally in Thailand.

Zongo was a Burkina Faso international, making his debut in 2013.

Club career

Almería
Born in Ouagadougou, Zongo began his career with hometown club US Ouagadougou. In October 2010, he moved to Spain and joined UD Almería, being initially assigned to the reserve team in the Segunda División B. One month after arriving he suffered a knee injury, going on to miss several weeks.

Zongo made his official debut with the Andalusians' main squad on 13 January 2011, coming on as a second-half substitute for Kalu Uche in a 1–0 home win against Deportivo de La Coruña in the quarter-finals of the Copa del Rey. He played his first game in the Segunda División on 29 January of the following year, against Gimnàstic de Tarragona.

Again coming from the bench, Zongo scored his first goals for Almería on 19 May 2012, netting a late brace in a 2–0 home victory over AD Alcorcón. For the 2012–13 season he was promoted to the first team, and appeared mostly from the bench in the early stages. However, in January, after the departures of Aarón Ñíguez and Leonardo Ulloa, he began being more utilised in manager Javi Gracia's starting XI as a winger, keeping his place under Gracia's successor Francisco.

On 28 June 2013, Zongo was definitely promoted to Almería's main squad, with the club in La Liga. In August, however, he declined a first-team contract, being again demoted to the reserves. On 12 November he finally agreed to a deal, running until 2017.

Zongo played his first match in the Spanish top division on 4 January 2014, featuring the last 19 minutes in a 3–0 home defeat of Granada CF and becoming the first Burkinabé footballer to appear in the competition. He scored his first league goal late in the month, the only in a win over Getafe CF also at the Estadio de los Juegos Mediterráneos.

On 16 December 2014, in a 2–1 home win against Real Betis in the Copa del Rey, Zongo scored from 50 metres to lob goalkeeper Dani Giménez. He was regularly used during the campaign, but the side suffered relegation.

Zongo suffered a knee injury while on international duty in January 2017 and was sidelined for several months. His contract expired before he was fully recovered, and he left the club.

Later years
On 8 January 2019, following a lengthy period as a free agent, Zongo signed for Thai League 2 side Army United FC. He returned to Spain on 16 August, agreeing to a deal at CF Badalona of the third tier.

Zongo announced his retirement from professional football on 23 December 2020 at the age of 31, after failing to completely recover from his 2017 injury.

International career
On 7 August 2013, Zongo was called up to the Burkina Faso national team for a friendly with Morocco. He made his debut seven days later, playing the full 90 minutes in a 2–1 away win. On 21 May of the following year he scored his first international goal, the equaliser in a 1–1 draw against Senegal.

In January 2017, during a 2017 Africa Cup of Nations match against Gabon, Zongo suffered a severe knee injury.

Career statistics

Club

International

International goals

References

External links

Jonathan Zongo at Footballdatabase

1989 births
Living people
Sportspeople from Ouagadougou
Burkinabé footballers
Association football wingers
Association football forwards
US Ouagadougou players
La Liga players
Segunda División players
Segunda División B players
UD Almería B players
UD Almería players
CF Badalona players
Jonathan Zongo
Jonathan Zongo
Burkina Faso international footballers
2015 Africa Cup of Nations players
2017 Africa Cup of Nations players
Burkinabé expatriate footballers
Expatriate footballers in Spain
Expatriate footballers in Thailand
Burkinabé expatriate sportspeople in Spain
Burkinabé expatriate sportspeople in Thailand
21st-century Burkinabé people